Leonardo 'Leo' del Cristo Ramírez Rodríguez (born 20 June 1992) is a Spanish footballer who plays for UD Tamaraceite as a midfielder.

Football career
Born in Las Palmas, Canary Islands, Ramírez finished his graduation with UD Las Palmas' youth setup, and made senior debuts with the C-team in the 2011–12 campaign. In January 2013 he was promoted to the reserves in Tercera División.

On 11 September 2013 Ramírez played his first match as a professional, coming on as a second-half substitute in a 3–1 win at CE Sabadell FC, for the season's Copa del Rey. He made his league debut on 14 December, starting and playing the full 90 minutes in a 0–2 home loss against Real Madrid Castilla.

On 30 August 2015 Ramírez was loaned to Segunda División B side CP Cacereño, in a season-long deal. Roughly one year later, he moved to fellow league team Arandina CF also in a temporary deal.

On 15 July 2017, Ramírez moved to UE Llagostera also in the third division, on a one-year loan deal.

References

External links

1992 births
Living people
Footballers from Las Palmas
Spanish footballers
Association football midfielders
Segunda División players
Segunda División B players
Segunda Federación players
Tercera División players
UD Las Palmas C players
UD Las Palmas Atlético players
UD Las Palmas players
CP Cacereño players
Arandina CF players
UE Costa Brava players
UE Cornellà players
CD El Ejido players
SD Tarazona footballers
UD Tamaraceite footballers